Inusah Abdulai Bistav Fuseini (born 23 January 1962) is a Ghanaian lawyer and politician. He is a former member of parliament for Tamale Central constituency and the former Minister for Lands and Natural Resources in the Ghana government. He was the senior associate with the Law Trust Company in Accra before he went into politics.

Early life and education 
Fuseini is from Tishiegu-Tamale, in the Northern Region of Ghana. He was a senior associate with the Law Trust Company in Accra before he went into politics. He attended teacher training college at Bagabaga Training College (now Bagabaga College of Education) where he obtained his teacher certification to be a professional teacher. He then proceeded to the University of Ghana, Legon, for his bachelor's degree in law. He also has a master's degree in law from the University of Ghana.

Political career
Fuseini, who is a member of the National Democratic Congress, became a member of parliament when Wayo Seini defected from the NDC to the New Patriotic Party. This triggered a by-election in the Tamale Central constituency on 4 April 2006. Fuseini won the election with a majority of 17,502. He successfully held his seat in the Ghanaian general election in December 2008 with 66% of the votes cast, in the Ghanaian general election in December 2012 and in 2016 with 59.81%.

Personal life
Fuseini is a Muslim and married with four children.

See also
 National Democratic Congress
 Tamale Central

References

External links
 Profile on Parliament of Ghana website
 Profile on GhanaDistricts.com

Living people
1962 births
Ghanaian Muslims
National Democratic Congress (Ghana) politicians
Ghanaian MPs 2005–2009
Ghanaian MPs 2009–2013
Ghanaian MPs 2013–2017
20th-century Ghanaian lawyers
Government ministers of Ghana